Sahabzada Tariq Ullah (born 25 April 1956) is a Pakistani politician who had been a member of the National Assembly of Pakistan, from June 2013 to May 2018.

Early life

He was born on 25 April 1956.

Political career

Tariq Ullah was elected to the National Assembly of Pakistan as a candidate of Jamaat-e-Islami Pakistan from Constituency NA-33 (Upper Dir-cum-Lower Dir) in 2013 Pakistani general election. He received 42,582 votes and defeated a candidate of Pakistan Peoples Party.

References

Living people
Jamaat-e-Islami Pakistan politicians
Pashtun people
1956 births
Pakistani MNAs 2013–2018